Major Matthew Fontaine Maury Meiklejohn VC (27 November 1870 – 4 July 1913) was a British recipient of the Victoria Cross, the highest and most prestigious award for gallantry in the face of the enemy that can be awarded to British and Commonwealth forces.

Details

Meiklejohn was the son of Professor John Meiklejohn, of the University of St. Andrews, and was educated at Madras College and Fettes College. He was 28 years old, and a captain in the 2nd Battalion, The Gordon Highlanders, British Army during the Second Boer War when the following deed took place at the Battle of Elandslaagte for which he was awarded the VC.

His VC action cost him his arm which was amputated. Despite this, he remained in the army as a staff officer. He was promoted to the substantive rank of captain of the Gordon Highlanders 22 January 1902, and was seconded as a staff officer posted at Saint Helena. He later achieved the rank of major.

His Victoria Cross is displayed at the Gordon Highlanders Museum along with his campaign medals.

Further information

His death occurred when he was riding his horse in Hyde Park and it bolted. With only one arm to control the horse, he took the choice to steer it into some cast iron railings, in order to avoid a nursemaid who was pushing a baby in her pram. This was considered to be an act of high bravery and cost him his life. He died on 4 July 1913 and was given a hero's funeral in Brookwood Cemetery. He is commemorated by a plaque on the wall of the Hyde Park Barracks, London.

Notes

References
Monuments to Courage (David Harvey, 1999)
The Register of the Victoria Cross (This England, 1997)
Victoria Crosses of the Anglo-Boer War (Ian Uys, 2000)

External links
angloboerwar.com
Location of grave and VC medal (Brookwood Cemetery)
The Brookwood Cemetery Society (Known Holders of the Victoria Cross Commemorated in Brookwood Cemetery)

Second Boer War recipients of the Victoria Cross
British recipients of the Victoria Cross
Gordon Highlanders officers
Deaths by horse-riding accident in England
1870 births
1913 deaths
People educated at Fettes College
British military personnel of the Chitral Expedition
British military personnel of the Tirah campaign
British Army personnel of the Second Boer War
British amputees
Accidental deaths in London
Burials at Brookwood Cemetery
People from Clapham
Accidental deaths from falls
British Army recipients of the Victoria Cross
People educated at Madras College